Imoinu Iratpa or Emoinu Iratpa or Waakching Taranithoini Paanba is the religious festival of lights dedicated to the Meitei Goddess Imoinu Ahongbi. The festival is celebrated by the Meitei people following Sanamahism, especially in Manipur. The festival falls on the twelfth lunar day of Wakching month of Meitei calendar.

The festival is celebrated in Manipur, Assam, Tripura in India and Bangladesh as well as Myanmar.

References

Meitei festivals
Religious festivals in India